Jonas Bergström (born 11 May 1946) is a Swedish actor. He has appeared in more than 30 films and television shows since 1968.

Selected filmography
 Doctor Glas (1968)
 Ådalen 31 (1969)
 Lady Oscar (1979)
 Murder at the Savoy (1993)

References

External links

1946 births
Living people
20th-century Swedish male actors
21st-century Swedish male actors
Swedish male film actors
Swedish male television actors
Male actors from Stockholm